Hemotherapy or hemotherapeutics is the treatment of disease by the use of blood or blood products from blood donation (by others or for oneself).

It includes various types, such as:
 Blood transfusion
 Packed red blood cells transfusion
 Fresh frozen plasma transfusion
 Plasmapheresis of various kinds, including plasma exchange
 Autohemotherapy, with autologous blood that is usually modified in some way

References 

Transfusion medicine